Alexandra Braun Waldeck (born May 19, 1983) is a Venezuelan actress, model and beauty queen who won the 2005 edition of Miss Earth, an annual international beauty pageant promoting environmental awareness.

Braun won four international best actress awards in various film festivals all over the world for her portrayal of the lead role in the movie, "Uma" at the London Film Festival, Monaco International Film Festival, the Milan International Film Festival and the Georgia Latino Film Festival in Atlanta; the film also won recognition in the "Film of the World" category at the International Film Festival of India and won best foreign film at the Burbank International Film Festival in the United States.

Early life and background
Growing up in Caracas, Braun graduated cum laude with a bachelor's degree in Marketing and Advertising. Her family was from Germany but migrated to Venezuela after World War II.

Braun competed in the 2005 Miss Venezuela pageant, and represented Nueva Esparta where she placed first runner-up; she was then selected by Sambil Model Caracas to represent Venezuela at Miss Earth held in Manila, Philippines. She was crowned Miss Earth 2005 on October 23, 2005, where eighty contestants from all over the world took part in the competition. Braun also won the Best in Swimsuit. She was the first Venezuelan to win the competition. Her win made Venezuela the second country after Brazil to win all of the "Big Four" pageants.

Braun crowned her successor, Hil Hernández, during the 2006 Miss Earth pageant finale on November 26, 2006, held at the National Museum in Manila, Philippines. Her Miss Earth Venezuela successor, Marianne Puglia, was crowned Miss Earth Fire, the equivalent of 3rd runner up. She now has a career as an actress in Venezuela.

Miss Earth reign

During her Miss Earth reign, she met the President of the Philippines Gloria Macapagal Arroyo at the Malacañan Palace, which she considered as one of her most memorable experiences. Upon her return to Venezuela after winning the Miss Earth competition, Braun immediately spearheaded a reforestation program in Caracas, Maracaibo and Valencia with the help of Sambil Organization, the franchise holder of Miss Earth Venezuela contest. It was followed by the launching of the SAMI Tree Program, a fund-raising activity that educates children on the importance of protecting trees to save the environment.

In April 2006, she travelled to Singapore, together with the Miss Earth Foundation to co-host the United Nations Environment Programme or UNEP gala event, The Champions of the Earth, an annual awards programme to recognize outstanding environmental leaders at a policy level. She co-hosted the awarding ceremony on April 21, 2006, with Eric Falt, UNEP Director of Communications and Public Information.

As Miss Earth winner, Braun travelled the world to participate and promote environmental awareness programs with the Philippine-based Miss Earth Foundation. She also visited several countries including Canada, Puerto Rico, Chile, Indonesia, Philippines, Singapore, and Venezuela.

Life after Miss Earth
Braun's victory in Miss Earth 2005 has made her a household name in Venezuela and different parts of the world specially in modeling business. She started in a new stage of her life when she announced the launching of her own accessories brand name ¨DiBraun Accessories¨ with her twin sister Karina. She has appeared in a variety of magazines right after her reign including Philippine's 'Women's Journal', Variedades, Man, Ocean Drive, Maxim, Urbe, Que Pasa (Chile) and more. Braun is now an established model in Latin America, Europe and Asia appearing in numerous television spots, magazines and advertising campaigns in countries such as Philippines, Romania, Malaysia, Mexico, Honduras, Costa Rica, Bolivia and her home country Venezuela.

She started her career as an actress in Venezuela with her first movie directed by Abraham Pulido produced in 2012 and show to public in May 2015, ¨Hasta que la muerte nos separe¨ is about a model who falls in love with a boxer based on the novel Othelo by William Shakespeare.

She started to make her first appearance in theatre in the play ¨Boeing Boeing¨ directed by Tullio Cavalli in August 2013. In 2014 she started her first soap opera called ¨Amor Secreto¨ on T.V. Channel VENEVISION, as Alejandra Altamirano as the antagonist of the history. It was launched in May 2015. In 2016 she was called for performing her second teather play called "Cronicas desquiciadas".

In 2016 she made her second movie as the lead role in the movie "UMA" directed by Alain Maiki.

In January 2017 started her third feather play called "Relatos Borrachos". In May started a new TV project called "Ellas aman, ellos mienten" and also at the same time started a movie project "Blindados" directed by Carlos Malave.  In October 2018 she became Member of the ACACV  Venezuelan Arts and Science Cinematography Academy

Career background

Beauty contests
Braun competed in the following pageants:

Catalogs

Ambassador non-profit organizations

Filmography
In December 2017, Braun won Best Actress at the Monaco International Film Festival called the Angel Film Awards for her performance in a love story movie Uma, which was produced in Italy by the production company Epic In Motion & AMZ along with Natalia Denegri's Trinitus Productions. The movie also won the Best Film, Best Editing, Best Supporting Actress and Best Supporting Actor awards.

Braun's performance in the movie Uma further earned her best actress awards in the Milan International Film Festival and the Georgia Latino Film Festival in Atlanta.

In February 2018, she then won the Best Actress for the fourth time for the movie Uma at the London Film Festival which is produced by the British Film Institute which screens more than 300 films, documentaries and shorts from approximately 50 countries.

See also
 Miss Venezuela
 List of famous Venezuelans

References

External links
 
 Brief biography and interview
 Lifeofamodel.com - Latest interview with Miss Earth, Alexandra Braun, on winning the beauty competition and how it has changed her life
 Portfolio Alexandra Braun Waldeck's modeling portfolio

1983 births
Living people
Miss Earth winners
Miss Earth 2005 contestants
People from Caracas
Venezuelan female models
Venezuelan television presenters
Venezuelan people of German descent
Venezuelan beauty pageant winners
Venezuelan women television presenters